Lithium hypochlorite is the colorless, crystalline lithium salt of hypochlorous acid with the chemical formula of LiClO. It is used as a disinfectant for pools and a reagent for some chemical reactions.

Safety

Doses of 500 mg/kg cause clinical signs and significant mortality in rats. 
The use of chlorine-based disinfectants in domestic water, although widespread, has led to some controversy due to the formation of small quantities of harmful byproducts such as chloroform. 
Studies showed no uptake of lithium if pools with lithium hypochlorite have been used.

See also
 Sodium hypochlorite

References

   

Lithium salts
Hypochlorites
Disinfectants
Oxidizing agents